Charles Downs II House is a historic home located near Marlowe, Berkeley County, West Virginia. It was built in 1835 and is a two-story, L-shaped, brick dwelling measuring 53 feet wide and 50 feet deep.  It is five bays wide and three bays deep.  Also on the property are a cement block garage and wood-frame shed dating to the 1920s.

It was listed on the National Register of Historic Places in 1991.

References

Houses on the National Register of Historic Places in West Virginia
Federal architecture in West Virginia
Houses completed in 1835
Houses in Berkeley County, West Virginia
National Register of Historic Places in Berkeley County, West Virginia